Anuraphis is a genus of true bugs belonging to the family Aphididae.

The genus was first described by Del Guercio in 1907.

The genus has almost cosmopolitan distribution.

Species:
 Anuraphis catonii
 Anuraphis farfarae
 Anuraphis subterranea

References

Aphididae